Elonera Montessori School is located in Wollongong, New South Wales, and was established in 1987 by parents and friends of an alternative school who wished to offer a Montessori education.

The school is an organisation providing programs for students aged 18 months to 18 years.

School grounds
Elonera Montessori school was originally located in Foleys Road in Gwynneville. The school relocated to a premises in Mount Ousley.

The grounds include:

 1 chicken pen
 1 science lab   
 1 art room   
 1 photography room   
 0 computer rooms   
 1 gymnasiums   
 1 small library    
 1 kitchen

See also 

 List of non-government schools in New South Wales
 List of schools in Illawarra and the South East (New South Wales)
 Education in Australia

References

External links
https://elonera.nsw.edu.au

Educational institutions established in 1987
1987 establishments in Australia